Róbert Sighvatsson (born 13 November 1972) is an Icelandic handball player who competed in the 2004 Summer Olympics.

References

1972 births
Living people
Robert Sighvatsson
Robert Sighvatsson
Handball players at the 2004 Summer Olympics
HSG Wetzlar players